Fiel may refer to:

 Cristian Fiél (born 1980), German-Spanish football midfielder who plays for Dynamo Dresden
 Fiel van der Veen (born 1945), Dutch illustrator
 Eric E. Fiel, a general in the United States Air Force